Aira caryophyllea is a species of grass known by the common name silver hairgrass. It's a species of bunchgrass that is native to Europe, Africa, and Asia. It has been introduced to other continents, including North America, where it is naturalized and common.

Aira caryophyllea is a light green grass with a silvery sheen on its spikelets before it dries and becomes straw-colored to white. The spikelets are borne on a spreading panicle inflorescence.

References
Plants of the World Online
USDA Plants Profile
Jepson Manual Treatment
Species account
Photo gallery

Pooideae
Flora of Europe
Flora of Africa
Flora of Asia
Plants described in 1753
Taxa named by Carl Linnaeus